Aza is a given name in several parts of the world. In English, the usual pronunciation is azā (ah-zah). The name is a modern form of the name Reza.

Given name
 Aza of Mannea, king, reigned c. 710–700 BC
 Aza Gazgireyeva (1954–2009), Ingush supreme court justice
 Aza Habalova (born 1958), South Ossetian politician
 Aza Petrović (born 1959), Croatian basketball coach
 Aza Rakhmanova (1932–2015), Russian AIDS and hepatitis expert
 Aza Raskin (born 1984), American writer, entrepreneur, inventor

References

Persian masculine given names